Sandalovo is a rural locality (a village) in Abakanovskoye Rural Settlement, Cherepovetsky District, Vologda Oblast, Russia. The population was 17 as of 2002. There are 4 streets.

Geography 
Volkovo is the nearest locality. etimologia

References 

Rural localities in Cherepovetsky District